Mr. Pip is a 2012 film written and directed by Andrew Adamson and based on Lloyd Jones' novel Mister Pip. Hugh Laurie played Mr. Watts.

Plot

In 1989, as the Bougainville Civil War rages on in Papua New Guinea, Mr. Watts (Hugh Laurie), the only white man left on the island after a blockade, re-opens the local school. He begins reading the Charles Dickens novel Great Expectations, which transfixes a young girl named Matilda (Xzannjah Matsi). She finds comfort in the story of a Victorian orphan, Pip (Eka Darville), when her own world is falling apart. 

Matilda writes "Pip" in the sand, and this simple act leads to terrible consequences when the "Redskins", an army sent to destroy the local rebels, suspect Pip to be a rebel leader and demand he be brought before them. They do not believe Mr Watts when he tells them Pip is a made up story character from a book. They tell Matilda to find this book, if it is real, but Matilda cannot find the book and the Redskins burn everyone's furniture, as a punishment. They say next time, Pip had better be handed over or else. Later, Matilda finds the book wrapped up in a mat at home, and realised her disapproving mother, Dolores, hid it there. She is resentful and angry, even more so when Dolores and the other women burn all of Mr Watts' furniture too, along with the book, which Matilda placed in Mr Watts' desk drawer.

Mr Watts' wife Grace dies, and the women of the village realise they must stand through this together. Dolores and Matilda make up, and it seems all is well again. A while later, the Redskins appear again, demanding to be shown Pip or lives will be at stake. Mr Watts decides to sacrifice himself, pretending to be Pip. He is shot and fed to the pigs, as is another woman, her son, and Dolores, for speaking up.

After the Redskins have gone, the women and children mourn their friends' deaths. Matilda nearly drowns after she is pulled under by a strong current in the river, but is saved by some of the women in a boat. The island is no longer safe, and Matilda is forced to go to Australia, where her father migrated. A few years later, she is told Mr Watts left a will, and left most of his possessions for Matilda, including a flat which is occupied by his ex-wife. Matilda visits the flat and meets Mrs Watts, but decides to let her keep the flat after she finds the writing on the walls which Mr Watts told his class about.

Matilda visits the Charles Dickens museum and reconciles with her imaginary version of Pip, and cries, letting out all her emotion about the previous events. She later returns to the now peaceful island with her father and becomes a teacher.

Cast
 Hugh Laurie as Tom Watts
 Xzannjah Matsi as Matilda Naimo
 Healesville Joel as Dolores Naimo
 Eka Darville as Pip
 TaPiwa Soropa as Startop
 Kerry Fox as June Watts
 Florence Korokoro as Grace Watts
 David Kaumara as the Redskins lead officer
 Kausibona Mel as Daniel
 Sam Simiha as Sam
 Marcellin Ampa'oi as Joseph Naimo

Production
Mr. Pip was filmed in Bougainville, Papua New Guinea, and in New Zealand: on 29 and 30 July 2011 it was filmed at Glendowie College, and at a flight training centre at Albert Street, Auckland; the historic precinct of Oamaru represented Dickens' London, Richard Pearse Airport at Timaru represented the Mount Isa Airport at Queensland, and Kingsland Railway Station in Auckland represented Gravesend Station in England.

Post-production started in November–December 2011 at Park Road Post in Wellington, New Zealand, ready for release in 2012. The film premiered at the Toronto International Film Festival in September 2012. The trailer was released in April 2013, and the film opened in cinemas on 3 October.

Reception
The film received mixed reviews. Review aggregator Rotten Tomatoes reports that 44% of critics gave the film a positive review, with an average rating of 6 out of 10.

Dennis Harvey of Variety said that the film "Like fellow Kiwi Peter Jackson, Andrew Adamson has followed a run of large-scale fantasy entertainments (two "Shreks", two "Narnias") by adapting an inspirational-uplift literary novel". Harvey also wrote "This gimmicky story set during Papua New Guinea's civil war reaches for emotional effect in a fatally hamfisted fashion".

By contrast, the The New Zealand Herald gave the film 4 out of 5 stars, saying "it's a joy". The review applauded Laurie's portrayal of Mr Watts and notes that "the film belongs to Xzannjah, whose radiant yet unshowy performance nails Matilda dead centre and pulls off the tricky double act of being our eyes on the action and its central character". The review's verdict is "Smart and cinematically adventurous".

References

External links
 NZ On Screen - Mr Pip
 

2010s New Zealand films
2012 films
2012 drama films
Cinema of Papua New Guinea
New Zealand drama films
Films scored by Harry Gregson-Williams
Films shot in New Zealand
Films shot in Papua New Guinea
Films based on New Zealand novels
Autonomous Region of Bougainville
Films set in Papua New Guinea
Films set in Australia
Films set in England
Films directed by Andrew Adamson
Films with screenplays by Andrew Adamson